Fred Hawkins (10 November 1896 – 14 June 1976) was a British gymnast. He competed in nine events at the 1924 Summer Olympics.

References

External links
 

1896 births
1976 deaths
British male artistic gymnasts
Olympic gymnasts of Great Britain
Gymnasts at the 1924 Summer Olympics
Place of birth missing
20th-century British people